Henry Ingoldsby may refer to:
Sir Henry Ingoldsby, 1st Baronet (1622-1701), of the Ingoldsby baronets
Henry Ingoldsby (MP), MP for Limerick City 1727-9